Blansko District is a district in the South Moravian Region of the Czech Republic. Its capital is the town of Blansko.

Administrative division
Blansko District is divided into two administrative districts of municipalities with extended competence: Blansko and Boskovice.

List of municipalities
Towns are marked in bold and market towns in italics:

Adamov -
Bedřichov -
Benešov -
Blansko -
Borotín -
Bořitov -
Boskovice -
Brťov-Jeneč -
Bukovina -
Bukovinka -
Býkovice -
Černá Hora -
Černovice -
Cetkovice -
Chrudichromy -
Crhov -
Deštná -
Dlouhá Lhota -
Doubravice nad Svitavou -
Drnovice -
Habrůvka -
Hodonín -
Holštejn -
Horní Poříčí -
Horní Smržov -
Jabloňany -
Jedovnice -
Kněževes -
Knínice -
Kořenec -
Kotvrdovice -
Kozárov -
Krasová -
Křetín -
Krhov -
Křtěnov -
Křtiny -
Kulířov -
Kunčina Ves -
Kunice -
Kuničky -
Kunštát - 
Lazinov -
Lažany -
Letovice -
Lhota Rapotina -
Lhota u Lysic -
Lhota u Olešnice -
Lipovec -
Lipůvka -
Louka -
Lubě -
Ludíkov -
Lysice -
Makov -
Malá Lhota -
Malá Roudka -
Míchov -
Milonice -
Němčice -
Nýrov -
Obora -
Okrouhlá -
Olešnice -
Olomučany -
Ostrov u Macochy -
Pamětice -
Petrov -
Petrovice -
Prostřední Poříčí -
Rájec-Jestřebí -
Ráječko -
Roubanina -
Rozseč nad Kunštátem -
Rozsíčka -
Rudice -
Šebetov -
Sebranice -
Šebrov-Kateřina -
Senetářov -
Skalice nad Svitavou -
Skrchov -
Sloup -
Šošůvka -
Spešov -
Štěchov -
Stvolová -
Sudice -
Suchý -
Sulíkov -
Světlá -
Svinošice -
Svitávka -
Tasovice -
Uhřice -
Újezd u Boskovic -
Újezd u Černé Hory -
Úsobrno -
Ústup -
Valchov -
Vanovice -
Vavřinec - 
Vážany -
Velenov -
Velké Opatovice -
Vilémovice -
Vísky -
Voděrady -
Vranová -
Vysočany -
Závist -
Zbraslavec -
Žďár -
Žďárná -
Žernovník -
Žerůtky

Geography

The landscape is rugged and it has mostly the character of highlands. The territory extends into four geomorphological mesoregions: Drahany Highlands (most of the territory), Upper Svratka Highlands (northwest), Boskovice Furrow (a strip from southwest to northeast) and Svitavy Uplands (north).

The most important river is the Svitava, which flows across the entire territory from north to south. A notable river is also the Punkva, the longest underground river in the country. There are not many bodies of water, the most notable are Letovice Reservoir and Olšovec Pond.

Most of the Moravian Karst Protected Landscape Area lies in the district, in its southern part. It includes the Macocha Gorge and cave systems.

Demographics

Most populated municipalities

Economy
The largest employers with its headquarters in Blansko District and at least 500 employers are:

Transport
There are no motorways passing through the district. The most important road is the I/43 (part of European route E461) from Brno to Svitavy.

Sights

The most important monuments in the district, protected as national cultural monuments, are:
Kunštát Castle
Lysice Castle
Rájec nad Svitavou Castle in Rájec-Jestřebí
Church of the Name of the Virgin Mary in Křtiny
Zwettl Altar in Adamov
Stará huť ironworks in Adamov

The best-preserved settlements and landscapes, protected as monument reservations and monument zones, are:
Stará Huť industrial area in Adamov (monument reservation)
Boskovice
Veselka

The most visited tourist destination is the Macocha Gorge.

References

External links

Blansko District profile on the Czech Statistical Office's website

 
Districts of the Czech Republic